The Gardena Valley News is a weekly newspaper published each Thursday. It serves the Gardena, California area, and has an estimated circulation of  10,000.

History 
Founded in 1904 by H. C. Morrill as the Gardena Reporter, the four-page paper billed itself as an independent, with editor Morrill taking positions against the Republican party of which he was an officer.

Starting in 1928, the paper was edited by Lew Guild, who threw his support into the fight for incorporation of Gardena. The town was incorporated in 1930.

In 1946, the paper was purchased from Lew Guild by Amos Dow, a former Nevada publisher. Dow, a veteran, had been in poor health since being gassed in World War I. Dow died shortly after the purchase, passing the paper on to his wife Agnes. Agnes Dow acted as not only publisher, but also reporter and editor for the paper. When Agnes Dow retired in 1957, she passed the paper to her brother, Don Algie. Algie died in 2008.

References

Newspapers published in Greater Los Angeles
Gardena, California
Weekly newspapers published in California